I Don't Mind may refer to:
"I Don't Mind" (Buzzcocks song)
"I Don't Mind" (James Brown song)
"I Don't Mind" (Lindsey Buckingham song)
"I Don't Mind" (Usher song)
"Don't Mind" (Kent Jones song)
"Don't Mind" (Mary J. Blige song)
"I Don't Mind", by A. J. Croce from Fit to Serve
"I Don't Mind", by American Steel from Jagged Thoughts
"I Don't Mind", by Ashanti from Chapter II
"I Don't Mind", by Ayiesha Woods from Introducing Ayiesha Woods
"I Don't Mind", by Badfinger from No Dice
"I Don't Mind", by David Lyttle from Interlude
"I Don't Mind", by The Decemberists from 5 Songs
"I Don't Mind", by Detroit Grand Pubahs from Madd Circus
"I Don't Mind", by Dr. Feelgood from Down by the Jetty
"I Don't Mind", by Duke Ellington from The Blanton–Webster Band
"I Don't Mind", by Ethan Johns from Silver Liner
"I Don't Mind", by Fat Mattress from their self-titled debut album
"I Don't Mind", by Girl's Day from Expectation
"I Don't Mind", by Gotthard from Need to Believe
"I Don't Mind", by Gun from 0141 632 6326
"I Don't Mind", by Hoodoo Gurus from Kinky
"I Don't Mind", by Immature & Mix
"I Don't Mind", by Jason Falkner from I'm OK, You're OK
"I Don't Mind", by Jimmy Harnen from Can't Fight the Midnight
"I Don't Mind", by K-Ci and JoJo from Emotional
"I Don't Mind", by Ken Block from Drift
"I Don't Mind", by The Kooks from the single "Ooh La"
"I Don't Mind", by Kubb from Mother
"I Don't Mind", by Lloyd from Street Love
"I Don't Mind", by Meg Baird from Don't Weigh Down the Light
"I Don't Mind", by The Pierces from Light of the Moon
"I Don't Mind", by Rabbit, also covered by Eric Burdon from Soul of a Man
"I Don't Mind", by Royal Bliss from Life In-Between
"I Don't Mind", by Sista from 4 All the Sistas Around da World
"I Don't Mind", by Slade from Slayed?
"I Don't Mind", by Stephanie Nakasian from I Love You
"I Don't Mind", by Terry Ellis from Southern Gal
"I Don't Mind", by Timothy B. Schmit from Expando
"I Don't Mind", by Tom Goss featuring Max Emerson
"I Don't Mind", by Ty Tabor from Safety
"I Don't Mind", by Waylon Jennings from Folk-Country
"Don't Mind", a song by Romanian singer Inna from her fifth studio album Nirvana (2017).